One sharp may refer to:
G major, a major musical key with one sharp
E minor, a minor musical key with one sharp